Algarobius bottimeri, known generally as the kiawe bean weevil or Bottimer's Texas bruchid, is a species of leaf beetle in the family Chrysomelidae. It is found in Central America, North America, and Oceania.

References

Further reading

External links

 

Bruchinae
Articles created by Qbugbot
Beetles described in 1972